Capel Celyn was a rural community to the northwest of Bala in Gwynedd, Wales, in the Afon Tryweryn valley. The village and other parts of the valley were flooded in the Tryweryn flooding of 1965 to create a reservoir, Llyn Celyn, in order to supply Liverpool and Wirral with water for industry. At the time the village was one of the few remaining that were Welsh speaking. The flooding of the village was controversial as Liverpool City Council did not require planning consent from the local Welsh authorities as the reservoir was approved via an Act of Parliament. As a consequence there was no local debate on the proposal.

Etymology 
 is Welsh for chapel, while  is Welsh for holly.

Flooding 

When the valley was flooded in 1965, the village and its buildings, including the post office, the school, and a chapel with cemetery, were all lost. Twelve houses and farms were submerged, and 48 people of the 67 who lived in the valley lost their homes.

References 

Villages in Gwynedd
Villages in Snowdonia
Forcibly depopulated communities in Wales
Forcibly depopulated communities in the United Kingdom